William Cabell Bruce (March 12, 1860May 9, 1946) was an American politician and Pulitzer Prize-winning writer who represented the State of Maryland in the United States Senate from 1923 to 1929.

Background

Bruce was born in Charlotte County, Virginia to Charles and Sarah Alexander (Seddon) Bruce (a sister of James Seddon), and received an academic education at Norwood High School and College in Nelson County, Virginia.  He later attended the University of Virginia where he bested Woodrow Wilson in both a highly contested formal debate and an essay competition. In 1882, he graduated from the University of Maryland School of Law.

Career

Bruce was admitted to the Maryland bar the same year and commenced law practice in Baltimore, Maryland.  In addition to his career in law, Bruce was also writer, and received a Pulitzer Prize in 1918 for his book Benjamin Franklin, Self-Revealed.

Bruce began his political career in the Maryland Senate, serving from 1894 to 1896, and was appointed as president of the Senate in 1896.  He served as head of the city law department of Baltimore from 1903 to 1908; as a member of the Baltimore Charter Commission in 1910; and as general counsel to the Maryland Public Service Commission from 1910 to 1922, at which time he resigned.

Bruce was an unsuccessful candidate for the Democratic nomination for United States Senator in 1916, but achieved election six years later in the election of 1922.  Bruce was defeated in the next election in 1928 by Republican Phillips Lee Goldsborough, and resumed the practice of law in Baltimore until 1937, when he retired.

Personal and death
Bruce married Louise Este Fisher on October 15, 1887. They had four sons, William Fisher Bruce, James Cabell Bruce, William Cabell Bruce, and David K. E. Bruce.

He died in Ruxton, Maryland, on May 9, 1946.  He is buried at St. Thomas' Episcopal Church Cemetery in Garrison, Maryland.

Select works

 Benjamin Franklin, Self-Revealed: A Biographical Sketch and Critical Study Based Mainly on His Own Writings; New York, London: G. P. Putnam's Sons, 1917. (Available online: Vol. I, Vol. II.)
 Below the James: A Plantation Sketch; New York: The Neale Publishing Company, 1918. (Available online.)
 John Randolph of Roanoke, 1773–1833; A Biography Based Largely on New Material, in 2 volumes; New York, London: G. P. Putnam's Sons, 1922. (Available online: Vol. I, Vol. II.)
 Imaginary Conversations with Franklin, G. P. Putnam's Sons, 1933.
 Recollections: and, The Inn of Existence, 1936.
  (1891)

See also

 James Cabell Bruce 
 David K. E. Bruce

References

External links

 
 
 Biography at the Maryland State Archives
 

1860 births
1946 deaths
Democratic Party Maryland state senators
Pulitzer Prize for Biography or Autobiography winners
University of Maryland Francis King Carey School of Law alumni
Democratic Party United States senators from Maryland
Presidents of the Maryland State Senate
Politicians from Baltimore
Lawyers from Baltimore